Julio Bonnet (born c.1925) was an Argentine weightlifter. He competed in the men's middleweight event at the 1948 Summer Olympics.

References

External links
 

Year of birth missing
Possibly living people
Argentine male weightlifters
Olympic weightlifters of Argentina
Weightlifters at the 1948 Summer Olympics
Place of birth missing